Elections were held in the state of Western Australia on 20 February 1971 to elect all 51 members to the Legislative Assembly and 15 members to the 30-seat Legislative Council. The four-term Liberal-Country Party coalition government, led by Premier David Brand, was defeated by the Labor Party, led by Opposition Leader John Tonkin.

This was the first election in which no seats were uncontested since the introduction of responsible government in 1890. This was partly due to the Democratic Labor Party deciding to contest every seat up for election in both Houses.

There was a large increase in the number of electors, because this was the first election after 18 year olds had been given the vote.

Results

Legislative Assembly

|}

Legislative Council

|}

Post-election pendulum

See also
 Candidates of the 1971 Western Australian state election
 Members of the Western Australian Legislative Assembly, 1968–1971
 Members of the Western Australian Legislative Assembly, 1971–1974

References

Elections in Western Australia
1971 elections in Australia
1970s in Western Australia
February 1971 events in Australia